Valley Lutheran High School is a private Lutheran high school (grades 9–12) in Phoenix, Arizona,  United States. It opened in 1981. It is associated with the Lutheran Church–Missouri Synod.

A new gym was built and opened around May 2007.

Sports

The school offers several men's and women's sports teams, including:
 Baseball: 2A
 Basketball – Boys': 2A
 Basketball – Girls': 2A
 Cross Country – Boys': Division IV, Section I
 Cross Country – Girls': Division IV, Section IV
 Football: 2A
 Soccer – Boys' (W): 3A Region 8
 Softball: 2A
 Spiritline: Division III
 Tennis – Boys': Division III, Section V
 Tennis – Girls': Division III, Section V
 Track – Boys': Division IV
 Track – Girls': Division IV
 Volleyball – Girls': 2A
 Wrestling: Division IV, Section I

References

External links
 

High schools in Phoenix, Arizona
Lutheran schools in Arizona
Private high schools in Arizona
Secondary schools affiliated with the Lutheran Church–Missouri Synod